Itanhandu is a city in the south of Minas Gerais, Brazil with a population of 15,423 and a total area of 143,9 km².

References

Municipalities in Minas Gerais